Pagulayan is a Filipino surname. Notable people with the surname include:

 Alex Pagulayan (born 1978), Filipino-Canadian pool snooker player
 Carlo Pagulayan (born 1978), Filipino comic book artist

Tagalog-language surnames